Hagar is both a feminine given name and a surname. Notable people with the name include:

Given name:
 Hagar Badran (born 1989), Egyptian synchronized swimmer
 Hagar Finer (b. 1984), Israeli WIBF bantamweight champion
 Hagar Olsson (1893–1978), Finnish writer, literary critic, playwright and translator
 Hagar Wilde (1905–1971), American writer and screenwriter
 Hagar Yanai (born 1972), Israeli writer

Surname:
 Albert Hagar (1827-1924), Canadian politician
 Mandy Hagar (b. 1960), New Zealand children's author
 Regan Hagar, drummer with Malfunkshun
 Sammy Hagar (b. 1947), rock musician

References 

Feminine given names